The Sri Lankan Chess Championship is organised by the Chess Federation of Sri Lanka, and was first held in 1972. The Sri Lankan Women's Chess Championship was first held in 1979.

National championship winners

{| class="sortable wikitable"
! Year !! Champion
|-
|1972/73||Christoper Parakrama
|-
|1974||G. A. S. Dissnayake
|-
|1975||R. Ananthan
|-
|1976||R. J. D. Ferdinands
|-
|1977||Harsha Aturupane
|-
|1978||L. C. Goonethilleke
|-
|1979||L. C. Goonethilleke and C. S. S. Pitigala (joint champions)
|-
|1980||T. D. R. Peiris and Harinlal Aturupane (joint champions)
|-
|1981||Harsha Aturupane
|-
|1982||Harsha Aturupane
|-
|1983||T. D. R. Peiris
|-
|1984||Harinlal Aturupane
|-
|1985||Harinlal Aturupane
|-
|1986||Harinlal Aturupane
|-
|1987||Ishan Weerakoon
|-
|1988||Harinlal Aturupane
|-
|1989||Harinlal Aturupane
|-
|1990||Not Held
|-
|1991||Not Held
|-
|1992||Harinlal Aturupane
|-
|1993||Not Held
|-
|1994||Muditha Hettigama
|-
|1995||T. D. R. Peiris
|-
| 1996 || Luxman Wijesuriya
|-
|1997||Nirosh De Silva
|-
|1998||Not Held
|-
|1999||Nirosh De Silva, Ruchira Amarasinghe, Uddama Amarawickrama (joint champions)
|-
| 2000 || Luxman Wijesuriya
|-
| 2001 ||Nirosh de Silva
|-
| 2002 ||Nirosh de Silva
|-
| 2003 ||Athula Russell
|-
| 2004 || T. D. R. Peiris
|-
| 2005 ||Athula Russell
|-
| 2006 ||Athula Russell
|-
| 2007 || G. C. Anuruddha
|-
| 2008 ||Athula Russell
|-
| 2009 ||Athula Russell
|-
| 2010 ||Athula Russell
|-
| 2011 ||Chamika Perera
|-
| 2012 ||Isuru Alahakoon
|-
| 2013 ||Isuru Alahakoon
|-
| 2014 ||Isuru Alahakoon
|-
| 2015 ||Dulan Edirisinghe
|- 
| 2016 ||Rajeendra Kalugampitiya
|- 
| 2017 ||Minul Doluweera
|-
| 2018 ||Isuru Alahakoon
|-
| 2019 ||Harshana Thilakarathne
|-
|2020
|Ranindu Dilshan Liyanage
|}

Women's championship winners

{| class="sortable wikitable"
! Year !! Champion
|-
| 1979 ||Anoja Senevirate
|-
| 1980 || Suneetha Wijesuriya and Rosana Jayasuriya
|- 
| 1981 ||Amarangi De Silva
|-
| 1982 ||Suneetha Wijesuriya
|- 
| 1983 ||Suneetha Wijesuriya
|-
| 1984 ||Suneetha Wijesuriya
|- 
| 1985 ||Amarangi De Silva
|-
| 1986 ||Suneetha Wijesuriya
|-
| 1987 ||Suneetha Wijesuriya
|- 
| 1988 ||Suneetha Wijesuriya
|-
| 1989 || Vineetha Wijesuriya and Nihara Amarawickrama
|-
| 1990 || Not Held
|-
| 1991 || Not Held
|- 
| 1992 ||Amarangi De Silva
|- 
| 1993 || Not Held
|- 
| 1994 ||Amarangi De Silva
|- 
| 1995 ||Suneetha Wijesuriya
|-
| 1996 ||Malintha Fernando
|-
| 1997 ||Suneetha Wijesuriya
|- 
| 1998 ||Vineetha Wijesuriya
|-
| 1999 ||Vineetha Wijesuriya
|-
| 2000 ||Vineetha Wijesuriya
|-
| 2001 ||Vineetha Wijesuriya
|-
| 2002 ||Vineetha Wijesuriya
|-
| 2003 ||Vineetha Wijesuriya
|-
| 2004 ||U. G. Y. Methmali
|-
| 2005 ||U. G. Y. Methmali
|-
| 2006 ||Pramodya Senanayake
|-
| 2007 ||Vineetha Wijesuriya
|-
| 2008 ||Vineetha Wijesuriya
|-
| 2009 || Sachini Ranasinghe
|-
| 2010 ||Dinushki Premanath
|-
| 2011 ||Sachini Ranasinghe
|-
| 2012 ||Sachini Ranasinghe
|-
| 2013 ||Sachini Ranasinghe
|-
| 2014 ||Dasuni Mendis
|-
| 2015 ||Dasuni Mendis
|- 
| 2016 ||Saumy Zainab
|- 
| 2017 ||Sayuni Gihansa Jayaweera
|- 
| 2018 ||Dinushki Premanath
|-
| 2019 ||Sayuni Gihansa Jayaweera
|}

References

Chess in Sri Lanka
Chess national championships
Women's chess national championships
Chess
Recurring sporting events established in 1972
Recurring sporting events established in 1979
Chess
Chess
1972 in chess
1979 in chess
Annual events in Sri Lanka